Mythic Quest (known as Mythic Quest: Raven's Banquet for its first season) is an American comedy television series created by Charlie Day, Megan Ganz, and Rob McElhenney for Apple TV+. The series premiered on February 7, 2020, and follows a fictional video game studio that produces a popular MMORPG called Mythic Quest.

Apple TV+ renewed the series for a second season on January 18, 2020, ahead of its first season premiere. A special episode called "Quarantine" was released on May 22, 2020, with the second special episode "Everlight" being released on April 16, 2021, ahead of the season two premiere. The second season premiered on May 7, 2021. In October 2021, the series was renewed for a third and fourth season. The third season premiered on November 11, 2022.

Premise
The series follows a fictional video game studio that produces Mythic Quest, a popular MMORPG, run by the game's creator and creative director Ian Grimm (Rob McElhenney). At the start of the series, the studio is about to release a major expansion pack to the game, titled Raven's Banquet. Grimm argues with lead engineer Poppy Li (Charlotte Nicdao), head of monetization Brad Bakshi (Danny Pudi), and head writer C.W. Longbottom (F. Murray Abraham).

Cast and characters

Main
 Rob McElhenney as Ian Grimm, the creative director of Mythic Quest and later GrimPop. "Ian" is pronounced "Eye-In".
Judah Prehn portrays a young Ian Grimm ("Sarian")
 Ashly Burch as Rachel, a game tester and later head of monetization for Mythic Quest.
 Jessie Ennis as Jo, David’s assistant and Brad’s former assistant.
 Imani Hakim as Dana Bryant, a game tester for Mythic Quest and later GrimPop.
 David Hornsby as David Brittlesbee, the executive producer of Mythic Quest.
 Charlotte Nicdao as Poppy Liwanag / Poppy Li, the lead engineer and later co-creative director of Mythic Quest and later GrimPop.
Isla Rose Hall portrays a young Poppy Liwanag ("Sarian")
 Danny Pudi as Brad Bakshi, the head of monetization and later a janitor for Mythic Quest.
 F. Murray Abraham as Carl Longbottom / C.W. Longbottom (seasons 1–2), the head writer of Mythic Quest.
 Josh Brener portrays a young Carl Longbottom ("Backstory!")
 Naomi Ekperigin as Carol (season 3; recurring seasons 1–2), the head of human resources and later the head of diversity and inclusion for Mythic Quest.

Recurring
 Caitlin McGee as Sue Gorgon
 Elisha Henig as Brendan / Pootie Shoe (season 1)
 Aparna Nancherla as Michelle (season 1)
 John DiMaggio as Dan Williams (season 1)
 Craig Mazin as Lou (season 1)
Mazin also portrays Sol Green ("Backstory!")
 Humphrey Ker as Paul (seasons 1–2)
 Derek Waters as Phil (seasons 2–3)
 Mort Burke as Anthony (seasons 2–3)
 Ben Stillwell as Kai (season 3)
 Austin Zajur as Travor (season 3)

Guest
 Jake Johnson as Michael / Doc ("A Dark Quiet Death"), a video game developer and Beans' partner on the Dark Quiet Death video game.
 Cristin Milioti as Beans ("A Dark Quiet Death"), a video game developer and Doc's partner on the Dark Quiet Death video game.
 Geoffrey Owens as Tom ("A Dark Quiet Death")
 Alanna Ubach as Shannon ("Brendan" & "Playpen")
 Anthony Hopkins as The Narrator ("Everlight")
 Jason Fuchs as Strauss ("#YumYum")
 Parvesh Cheena as Zack Bakshi ("Breaking Brad" & "TBD")
 Snoop Dogg as himself ("Breaking Brad")
 William Hurt as Peter Cromwell ("Peter")
 Michael Cassidy portrays a young Peter Cromwell ("Backstory!")
 Shelley Hennig as A. E. Goldsmith ("Backstory!")
Hennig also portrays Ginny Cromwell ("Peter")
 Joe Manganiello as himself ("The Two Joes" & "The Year of Phil")
 Lindsey Kraft as Sarah Grimm ("Sarian")
 Haley Magnus as Olivia Liwanag ("Sarian")
 Casey Sander as Grandpop Joe ("Sarian")
 Dionysio Basco as Benito Liwanag ("Sarian")
 Sam Witwer as Ian Grimm Sr. ("Sarian")
 Robert Picardo as Principal Taggart ("Sarian")
 Andrew Friedman as Andy ("The Year of Phil" & "Buffalo Chicken Pizza")
 Michael Naughton as Mikey ("The Year of Phil" & "Buffalo Chicken Pizza")

Episodes

Season 1: Raven's Banquet (2020)

Specials (2020–21)

Season 2 (2021)

Season 3 (2022–23)

Production

Development
On August 9, 2018, it was announced that Apple had given a series order to a new half-hour comedy series written by Rob McElhenney, Megan Ganz, and Charlie Day, all of whom also serve as executive producers alongside Michael Rotenberg, Nicholas Frenkel, Gérard Guillemot, Jason Altman, and Danielle Kreinik. Production companies involved with the series consist of RCG Productions, 3 Arts Entertainment, and Ubisoft Film & Television. On January 18, 2020, it was announced that Apple had renewed the series for a second season, ahead of its season 1 premiere. In February 2021, it was revealed that the second season would premiere on Apple TV+ on May 7, 2021.

Ubisoft, a large video game publisher, assisted with development of the series. McElhenney said the concept of the show resulted from a discussion Ubisoft had with him about producing a television show around video games. McElhenney had been invited to Ubisoft Montreal to discuss the project, and though he was initially hesitant, as he toured the studio, he saw the potential vision for the show. Since then, Ubisoft has assisted in designing the video game characters and game world, as well as providing other art assets for the show. Ubisoft also helped the writers with details of video game development to stay authentic to industry approaches. On October 21, 2021, Apple renewed the series for a third and fourth season.

Casting
Alongside the initial series announcement, it was confirmed that Rob McElhenney would star in the series. On February 1, 2019, it was announced that F. Murray Abraham, Imani Hakim, David Hornsby, Danny Pudi, Ashly Burch, Charlotte Nicdao and Jessie Ennis had joined the cast of the series. Anthony Hopkins was cast as the narrator in the special "Everlight" in April 2021. Also in April, alongside the season two trailer release, Apple announced that Humphrey Ker, Chris Naoki Lee, and Jonathan Wiggs were part of the season two cast, with Snoop Dogg and Derek Waters guest starring. In April 2022, it was announced that F. Murray Abraham had exited the series and would not return for the third season. In July 2022, it was revealed that Joe Manganiello would appear in season three.

Filming
In March 2019, it was reported by The New York Times that filming of season one had concluded. The special, titled Mythic Quest: Quarantine, was written, shot, and edited in just three weeks, all remotely during the COVID-19 pandemic, using products supplied by Apple, such as iPhones. On November 11, 2020, Deadline Hollywood reported that the second season suspended production after positive COVID-19 tests of production team members. In December 2020, it was further reported that while Rob McElhenney claimed "to date there remains ZERO evidence of any transmission at work", at least 12 members of the production staff that worked in close contact with one another had contracted COVID-19, marking the second cluster of COVID-19 cases linked to the Mythic Quest production, and prompting another production suspension.

During a Mythic Quest panel at the Television Critics Association's Winter Press Tour in February 2021, McElhenney stated that he "did not want to be known as the person who got F. Murray Abraham very, very ill", elaborating that Abraham's character was continuing to work remotely for the first few episodes, and did not actually shoot in person until episode seven of the second season, where COVID testing occurred "as many times as five days a week," and Abraham's scenes only included "very small amounts of people on camera". In March 2021, Variety reported that a total of 26 crew members of Mythic Quest came down with COVID-19, making it "the worst outbreak of any show in Los Angeles".

Release
The first season consisting of nine episodes was released on February 7, 2020. A special episode ("Quarantine") focusing on the ongoing COVID-19 pandemic was released on May 22, 2020. A second special ("Everlight") was released on April 16, 2021, prior to the second season premiere. The second season premiered on May 7, 2021, and was released with weekly episodes.

Marketing 
On June 10, 2019, a trailer for the series was presented by McElhenney at Ubisoft's E3 2019 press conference, where he announced that Mythic Quest would premiere in the fall of 2019. On December 18, 2019, it was announced that the series would premiere on February 7, 2020.

Reception

Critical response

Season 1 
The review aggregation website Rotten Tomatoes reported a 90% approval rating, based on 39 reviews, with an average rating of 7.7/10. The website's critical consensus reads, "While it relies too heavily on the workplace comedy formula, Mythic Quest: Raven's Banquet is nonetheless hilarious and stands out for exploring the gaming industry with intelligence, thoughtfulness, and sincerity." Metacritic, which uses a weighted average, assigned a score of 73 out of 100 based on reviews from 12 critics, indicating "generally favorable reviews".

Season 2 
The second season received positive reviews. On Rotten Tomatoes, it has an approval rating of 100% based on 32 reviews with an average rating of 8.2/10. The website's critical consensus reads, "Smartly written, sharply performed, and sentimental without losing its sense of humor, Mythic Quests stellar second season solidifies its place as one of TV's best workplace comedies." On Metacritic, it has a score of 73 out of 100 based on 9 reviews, indicating "generally favorable reviews".

Season 3 
On Rotten Tomatoes, it has an approval rating of 94% based on 17 reviews with an average rating of 7.7/10. The website's critical consensus reads, "The core characters have gone their separate ways but Mythic Quest remains thematically cohesive as an acidic sendup of the gaming industry that never compromises its essence as a warm-hearted workplace comedy."

Accolades 

The series was recognized with The ReFrame Stamp for hiring people of underrepresented gender identities, and of color.

Other media

Audiobook
Inspired by the short story mentioned in the episode "Backstory!", Tears of the Anaren was released in June 2021 on Apple Books as an ebook and an audiobook, which is narrated by C.W. Longbottom (F. Murray Abraham) and Ian Grimm (Rob McElhenney).

Companion series
In December 2022, Apple TV+ ordered Mere Mortals, an eight-episode companion series created and written by Ashly Burch, John Howell Harris and Katie McElhenney. The series will feature entirely new characters and focus on the lives of employees, players and fans of the game Mythic Quest. The series has been compared to the stand-alone episodes "A Dark Quiet Death" and "Backstory!".

References

External links
 Mythic Quest at Apple TV+
  at Ubisoft
 

2020 American television series debuts
2020s American sitcoms
2020s American workplace comedy television series
Apple TV+ original programming
English-language television shows
Massively multiplayer online role-playing games in fiction
Television shows about video games
Television series by 3 Arts Entertainment
Television series by Lionsgate Television
Ubisoft